The Qionglai-Minshan conifer forests are a World Wide Fund for Nature ecoregion in Southwest China. These forests are classified as temperate coniferous forests and are part of the Palearctic realm.

Geography
The Qionglai-Minshan conifer forests cover the mountains along the easternmost edge of the Tibetan Plateau including the Min Mountains, Qionglai Mountains, Daxue Mountains, and Daliang Mountains.  In addition to these mountain ranges, the lower reaches of the Dadu River valley support significant portions of the forests.  The Qionglai-Minshan conifer forests are found almost entirely within western Sichuan, but small portions can also be found in southern Gansu and extreme northeast Yunnan.

Flora and fauna
The understory of the Qionglai-Minshan conifer forests is commonly made up of bamboo and this ecoregion is one of the last remaining habitats where wild giant pandas can be found.

Protected areas
Conservation areas and scenic spots within the Qionglai-Minshan conifer forests include Wolong National Nature Reserve and Jiuzhaigou Valley.

References

Palearctic ecoregions
Ecoregions of China
Montane forests
Temperate coniferous forests